The coat of arms that serves as a symbol of the town of Wolin, and the municipality of Wolin in West Pomeranian Voivodeship, Poland.

Design 
The coat of arms has a silver (white) French-style escutcheon, with the red griffin faced to the right, that holds the golden (yellow) flower of the plumeless thistle in his left arm. On the right, under his arm is located the golden (yellow) hexagram (six-pointed star).

History 

The first known appearance of the coat of arms of Wolin comes from 1301 seal, which depicted a griffin standing below an arch of the city gate, with the gata doors located on its left and right. The seals from 15th century depicted the coat of arms, as a griffin holding a plumeless thistles, with a star below it.

The current coat of arms has been established by the Town Council of Wolin on 29 April 1996.

Flag of Wolin 

The flag of the town of Wolin, and the municipality of Wolin, is a rectangle and consist of the coat of arms on the white background. The flag proportions are not specified, though in the establishing resolution, it was depicted with the proportions of 1:2. It was established together with the town coat of arms on 29 April 1996.

Gallery

References 

Wolin
Wolin
Wolin
Wolin
Wolin
1996 establishments in Poland